Kent Jean Carroll (August 22, 1926 – August 11, 2019) was a vice admiral in the United States Navy. He commanded the Military Sealift Command until his retirement around 1983. His awards include the Navy Distinguished Service Medal, Legion of Merit, and Defense Distinguished Service Medal. He is an alumnus of the University of Notre Dame.

He served as the first Commanding Officer of USS Blue Ridge Carroll died August 11, 2019.

References

United States Navy vice admirals
1926 births
Recipients of the Legion of Merit
University of Notre Dame alumni
2019 deaths
People from Newton, Iowa
Military personnel from Iowa